The following are the national records in Olympic weightlifting in Turkmenistan. Records are maintained in each weight class for the snatch lift, clean and jerk lift, and the total for both lifts by the Weightlilfting Federation of Turkmenistan.

Current records

Men

Women

Historical records

Men (1998–2018)

Women (1998–2018)

References

Turkmen
Olympic weightlifting
Records
Weightlifting